Polyrhachis hortensis is a species of ant in the subfamily Formicinae, found in Indonesia, and New Guinea. It was formerly considered as a subspecies of Polyrhachis hippomanes.

References

External links

 at antwiki.org
Animaldiversity.org
Itis.org

Formicinae
Hymenoptera of Asia